Gavin Hogg (born 30 October 1955) is a South African cricketer. He played in one List A match for Border in 1977/78.

See also
 List of Border representative cricketers

References

External links
 

1955 births
Living people
South African cricketers
Border cricketers